Huri (also Romanized as Ḩūrī; also known as Dīlanchī-ye Arkhī-ye Pā’īn) is a village in Dizajrud-e Sharqi Rural District, Qaleh Chay District, Ajab Shir County, East Azerbaijan Province, Iran. At the 2006 census, its population was 1,041 in 200 families.

References 

Populated places in Ajab Shir County